This article features the discography of Kosovo-Albanian rapper and songwriter Ledri Vula. His discography includes a studio album and numerous singles as a lead and featured artist.

Albums

Studio albums

Singles

As lead artist

As featured artist

References 

Discographies of Albanian artists